"Wiesław" is sometimes transliterated as "Wieslaw", in the absence of L with stroke.

Wiesław is a Polish masculine given name, of Slavonic origin, meaning "great glory" or "all glory". It is the shortened, more common, form of the personal name Wielisław. The feminine counterpart is Wiesława .

Individuals named Wiesław may choose their name day from the following dates: May 22, June 7, November 21, or December 9.

People with the name or its variants include:

 Wiesław Ochman (born 1937), Polish tenor
 Wiesław Jaguś (born 1975), Polish speedway rider
 Wiesław Perszke (born 1960), Polish long-distance runner
 Wiesław Michnikowski (1922–2017), Polish cabaret performer
 Wiesław Rosocha (born 1945), Polish graphic designer
 Wiesław Tarka (born 1964), Polish ambassador to Croatia
 "Comrade Wiesław", unofficial nickname of Władysław Gomułka (1905–1982), Polish communist and the actual head of state 1956–1970

See also
 Stary Wielisław (old Wielisław), a village in Poland
 Polish name
 Slavic names

References

Polish masculine given names
Slavic masculine given names
Masculine given names